Game design is the process of creating and shaping the mechanics, systems, and rules of a game. Games can be created for entertainment, education, exercise, or experimental purposes. Increasingly, elements and principles of game design are also applied to other interactions, in the form of gamification. Game designer and developer Robert Zubek defines game design by breaking it down into its elements, which he says are the following:

 Gameplay, which is the interaction between the player and the mechanics and systems 
 Mechanics and systems, which are the rules and objects in the game
 Player experience, which is how users feel when they're playing the game

Games such as board games, card games, dice games, casino games, role-playing games, sports, video games, war games, or simulation games benefit from the principles of game design.

Academically, game design is part of game studies, while game theory studies strategic decision making (primarily in non-game situations). Games have historically inspired seminal research in the fields of probability, artificial intelligence, economics, and optimization theory. Applying game design to itself is a current research topic in metadesign.

History

Sports (see history of sports), gambling, and board games are known, respectively, to have existed for at least nine thousand, six thousand, and four thousand years.

Folk process
Tabletop games played today whose descent can be traced from ancient times include chess, go, pachisi, backgammon, mahjong, mancala, and pick-up sticks. The rules of these games were not codified until early modern times and their features gradually evolved and changed over time, through the folk process. Given this, these games are not considered to have had a designer or been the result of a  design process in the modern sense.

After the rise of commercial game publishing in the late 19th century, many games that had formerly evolved via folk processes became commercial properties, often with custom scoring pads or preprepared material. For example, the similar public domain games Generala, Yacht, and Yatzy led to the commercial game Yahtzee in the mid-1950s.

Today, many commercial games, such as Taboo, Balderdash, Pictionary, or Time's Up!, are descended from traditional parlour games. Adapting traditional games to become commercial properties is an example of game design.

Similarly, many sports, such as soccer and baseball, are the result of folk processes, while others were designed, such as basketball, invented in 1891 by James Naismith.

New media
Technological advances have provided new media for games throughout history.

The printing press allowed packs of playing cards, adapted from Mahjong tiles, to be mass-produced, leading to many new card games. Accurate topographic maps produced as lithographs and provided free to Prussian officers helped popularize wargaming. Cheap bookbinding (printed labels wrapped around cardboard) led to mass-produced board games with custom boards.  Inexpensive (hollow) lead figurine casting contributed to the development of miniature wargaming. Cheap custom dice led to poker dice. Flying discs led to disc golf and Ultimate. Personal computers contributed to the popularity of computer games, leading to the wide availability of video game consoles and video games. Smart phones have led to a proliferation of mobile games.

The first games in a new medium are frequently adaptations of older games. Pong, one of the first widely disseminated video games, adapted table tennis. Later games will often exploit the distinctive properties of a new medium. Adapting older games and creating original games for new media are both examples of game design.

Theory

Game studies or gaming theory is a discipline that deals with the critical study of games, game design, players, and their role in society and culture. Prior to the late-twentieth century, the academic study of games was rare and limited to fields such as history and anthropology. As the video game revolution took off in the early 1980s, so did academic interest in games, resulting in a field that draws on diverse methodologies and schools of thought. These influences may be characterized broadly in three ways: the social science approach, the humanities approach, and the industry and engineering approach.

Broadly speaking, the social scientific approach has concerned itself with the question of "What do games do to people?" Using tools and methods such as surveys, controlled laboratory experiments, and ethnography researchers have investigated both the positive and negative impacts that playing games could have on people.
More sociologically informed research has sought to move away from simplistic ideas of gaming as either 'negative' or 'positive', but rather seeking to understand its role and location in the complexities of everyday life.

In general terms, the humanities approach has concerned itself with the question of "What meanings are made through games?" Using tools and methods such as interviews, ethnographies, and participant observation, researchers have investigated the various roles that videogames play in people's lives and activities together with the meaning they assign to their experiences.

From an industry perspective, a lot of game studies research can be seen as the academic response to the videogame industry's questions regarding the products it creates and sells. The main question this approach deals with can be summarized as "How can we create better games?" with the accompanying "What makes a game good?" "Good" can be taken to mean many different things, including providing an entertaining and engaging experience, being easy to learn and play, and being innovative, and having novel experiences. Different approaches to studying this problem have included looking at describing how to design games and extracting guidelines and rules of thumb for making better games

Strategic decision making

Game theory is a study of strategic decision making. Specifically, it is "the study of mathematical models of conflict and cooperation between intelligent rational decision-makers". An alternative term suggested "as a more descriptive name for the discipline" is interactive decision theory.
The subject first addressed zero-sum games, such that one person's gains exactly equal net losses of the other participant or participants. Today, however, game theory applies to a wide range of behavioral relations, and has developed into an umbrella term for the logical side of decision science.

The games studied in game theory are well-defined mathematical objects. To be fully defined, a game must specify the following elements: the players of the game, the information and actions available to each player at each decision point, and the payoffs for each outcome. (Rasmusen refers to these four "essential elements" by the acronym "PAPI".) A game theorist typically uses these elements, along with a solution concept of their choosing, to deduce a set of equilibrium strategies for each player such that, when these strategies are employed, no player can profit by unilaterally deviating from their strategy. These equilibrium strategies determine an equilibrium to the game—a stable state in which either one outcome occurs or a set of outcomes occur with known probability.

Design elements
Games can be characterized by "what the player does" and what the player experiences. This is often referred to as gameplay. Major key elements identified in this context are tools and rules that define the overall context of game.

Tools of play
Games are often classified by the components required to play them (e.g. miniatures, a ball, cards, a board and pieces, or a computer). In places where the use of leather is well established, the ball has been a popular game piece throughout recorded history, resulting in a worldwide popularity of ball games such as rugby, basketball, football, cricket, tennis, and volleyball. Other tools are more idiosyncratic to a certain region. Many countries in Europe, for instance, have unique standard decks of playing cards. Other games such as chess may be traced primarily through the development and evolution of its game pieces.

Many game tools are tokens, meant to represent other things. A token may be a pawn on a board, play money, or an intangible item such as a point scored.

Games such as hide-and-seek or tag do not utilise any obvious tool; rather, their interactivity is defined by the environment. Games with the same or similar rules may have different gameplay if the environment is altered. For example, hide-and-seek in a school building differs from the same game in a park; an auto race can be radically different depending on the track or street course, even with the same cars.

Rule development

Whereas games are often characterized by their tools, they are often defined by their rules. While rules are subject to variations and changes, enough change in the rules usually results in a "new" game. There are exceptions to this in that some games deliberately involve the changing of their own rules, but even then there are often immutable meta-rules.

Rules generally determine turn order, the rights and responsibilities of the players, each player's goals, and how game components interact with each other to produce changes in a game's state. Player rights may include when they may spend resources or move tokens.

Victory conditions
Common win conditions are being first to amass a certain quota of points or tokens (as in Settlers of Catan), having the greatest number of tokens at the end of the game (as in Monopoly), some relationship of one's game tokens to those of one's opponent (as in chess's checkmate), or reaching a certain point in a storyline (as in most roleplay-games).

Single or multiplayer
Most games require multiple players. Single-player games are unique in respect to the type of challenges a player faces. Unlike a game with multiple players competing with or against each other to reach the game's goal, a single-player game is against an element of the environment, against one's own skills, against time, or against chance. This is also true of cooperative games, in which multiple players share a common goal and win or lose together.

Many games described as "single-player" or "cooperative" could alternatively be described as puzzles or recreations, in that they do not involve strategic behavior (as defined by game theory), in which the expected reaction of an opponent to a possible move becomes a factor in choosing which move to make.

Games against opponents simulated with artificial intelligence differ from other single-player games in that the algorithms used usually do incorporate strategic behavior.

Storyline and plot
Stories told in games may focus on narrative elements that can be communicated through the use of mechanics and player choice. Narrative plots in games generally have a clearly defined and simplistic structure. Mechanical choices on the part of the designer(s) often drastically affect narrative elements in the game. However, due to a lack of unified and standardized teaching and understanding of narrative elements in games, individual interpretations, methods, and terminology vary wildly. Because of this, most narrative elements in games are created unconsciously and intuitively. However, as a general rule, game narratives increase in complexity and scale as player choice or game mechanics increase in complexity and scale. One example of this is removing a players ability to directly affect the plot for a limited time. This lack of player choice necessitates an increase in mechanical complexity and could be used as a metaphor to symbolize depression that is felt by a character in the narrative.

Luck and strategy
A game's tools and rules will result in its requiring skill, strategy, luck, or a combination thereof, and are classified accordingly.

Games of skill include games of physical skill, such as wrestling, tug of war, hopscotch, target shooting, and horseshoes, and games of mental skill such as checkers and chess. Games of strategy include checkers, chess, go, arimaa, and tic-tac-toe, and often require special equipment to play them. Games of chance include gambling games (blackjack, mah-jongg, roulette, etc.), as well as snakes and ladders and rock, paper, scissors; most require equipment such as cards or dice.

Most games contain two or all three of these elements. For example, American football and baseball involve both physical skill and strategy while tiddlywinks, poker, and Monopoly combine strategy and chance. Many card and board games combine all three; most trick-taking games involve mental skill, strategy, and an element of chance, as do many strategic board games such as Risk, Settlers of Catan, and Carcassonne.

Use as educational tool

By learning through play children can develop social and cognitive skills, mature emotionally, and gain the self-confidence required to engage in new experiences and environments.
Key ways that young children learn include playing, being with other people, being active, exploring and new experiences, talking to themselves, communicating with others, meeting physical and mental challenges, being shown how to do new things, practicing and repeating skills, and having fun.

Play develops children's content knowledge and provides children the opportunity to develop social skills, competencies, and disposition to learn.  Play-based learning is based on a Vygotskian model of scaffolding where the teacher pays attention to specific elements of the play activity and provides encouragement and feedback on children's learning. When children engage in real-life and imaginary activities, play can be challenging in children's thinking. To extend the learning process, sensitive intervention can be provided with adult support when necessary during play-based learning.

Development process
Game design is part of a game's development from concept to its final form. Typically, the development process is an iterative process, with repeated phases of testing and revision. During revision, additional design or re-design may be needed.

Development team

Game designer
A game designer (or inventor) is the person who invents a game's concept, its central mechanisms, and its rules.

Often, the game designer also invents the game's title and, if the game isn't abstract, its theme. Sometimes these activities are done by the game publisher, not the designer, or maybe dictated by a licensed property (such as when designing a game based on a film).

Game developer
A game developer is the person who fleshes out the details of a game's design, oversees its testing, and revises the game in response to player feedback.

Often the game designer is also its developer, although some publishers do extensive development of games to suit their particular target audience after licensing a game from a designer. For larger games, such as collectible card games and most video games, a team is used and the designer and developer roles are usually split among multiple people.

Game artist
A game artist is an artist who creates art for one or more types of games. Game artists are often vital to and credited in role-playing games, collectible card games and video games.

Many graphic elements of games are created by the designer when producing a prototype of the game, revised by the developer based on testing, and then further refined by the artist and combined with artwork as a game is prepared for publication or release.

Video game artists are responsible for all of the aspects of game development that call for visual art.

Concept
A game concept is an idea for a game, briefly describing its core play mechanisms, who the players represent, and how they win or lose.

A game concept may be "pitched" to a game publisher in a similar manner as film ideas are pitched to potential film producers. Alternatively, game publishers holding a game license to intellectual property in other media may solicit game concepts from several designers before picking one to design a game, typically paying the designer in advance against future royalties.

Design
During design, a game concept is fleshed out. Mechanisms are specified in terms of components (boards, cards, on-screen entities, etc.) and rules. The play sequence and possible player actions are defined, as well as how the game starts, ends, and what is its winning condition. In video games, storyboards and screen mockups may be created.

Prototype
A game prototype is a draft version of a game used for testing. Typically, creating a prototype marks the shift from game design to game development and testing. Although prototyping in regards to human-computer interaction and interaction design are both studied, the use of prototyping in game design has remained relatively unexplored. It's known that game design has clear benefits from prototyping, such as exploring new game design possibilities and technologies, the field of game design has different characteristics than other types of software industries that consider prototyping in game design in a different category and need a new perspective

Testing
Game testing is a major part of game development. During testing, players play the game and provide feedback on its gameplay, the usability of its components or screen elements, the clarity of its goals and rules, ease of learning, and enjoyment to the game developer. The developer then revises the design, its components, presentation, and rules before testing it again. Later testing may take place with focus groups to test consumer reactions before publication.

During testing, various balance issues may be identified, requiring changes to the game's design.

Video game testing is a software testing process for quality control of video games. The primary function of game testing is the discovery and documentation of software defects (aka bugs). Interactive entertainment software testing is a highly technical field requiring computing expertise, analytic competence, critical evaluation skills, and endurance.

Issues
Different types of games pose different game design issues.

Board games

Board game design is the development of rules and presentational aspects of a board game. When a player takes part in a game, it is the player's self-subjection to the rules that create a sense of purpose for the duration of the game. Maintaining the players' interest throughout the gameplay experience is the goal of board game design. To achieve this, board game designers emphasize different aspects such as social interaction, strategy, and competition, and target players of differing needs by providing for short versus long-play, and luck versus skill. Beyond this, board game design reflects the culture in which the board game is produced.

The most ancient board games known today are over 5000 years old. They are frequently abstract in character and their design is primarily focused on a core set of simple rules. Of those that are still played today, games like go (c.400BC), mancala (c.700AD), and chess (c.600AD) have gone through many presentational and/or rule variations. In the case of chess, for example, new variants are developed constantly, to focus on certain aspects of the game, or just for variation's sake.

Traditional board games date from the nineteenth and early twentieth century. Whereas ancient board game design was primarily focused on rules alone, traditional board games were often influenced by Victorian mores. Academic (e.g. history and geography) and moral didacticism were important design features for traditional games, and Puritan associations between dice and the Devil meant that early American game designers eschewed their use in board games entirely. Even traditional games that did use dice, like Monopoly (based on the 1906 The Landlord's Game), were rooted in educational efforts to explain political concepts to the masses. By the 1930s and 1940s, board game design began to emphasize amusement over education, and characters from comic strips, radio programmes, and (in the 1950s) television shows began to be featured in board game adaptations.

Recent developments in modern board game design can be traced to the 1980s in Germany, and have led to the increased popularity of "German-style board games" (also known as "Eurogames" or "designer games"). The design emphasis of these board games is to give players meaningful choices. This is manifested by eliminating elements like randomness and luck to be replaced by skill, strategy, and resource competition, by removing the potential for players to fall irreversibly behind in the early stages of a game, and by reducing the number of rules and possible player options to produce what Alan R. Moon has described as "elegant game design". The concept of elegant game design has been identified by The Boston Globe'''s Leon Neyfakh as related to Mihaly Csikszentmihalyi's the concept of "flow" from his 1990 book, "Flow: The Psychology of Optimal Experience".

Modern technological advances have had a democratizing effect on board game production, with services like Kickstarter providing designers with essential startup capital and tools like 3D printers facilitating the production of game pieces and board game prototypes.Hesse, Monica. "Rolling the dice on a jolly good pastime". The Washington Post. 29 August 2011. A modern adaptation of figure games are miniature wargames like Warhammer 40,000.

Card games
Card games include games with cards that are custom-tailored to the game, as in many modern games, as well as those whose design is constricted by the type of the deck of cards, like Tarot or the four-suited Latin decks. Card games can be played for fun, such as Go Fish, or as gambling games, such as Poker.

In Asian cultures, special sets of tiles can serve the same function as cards, as in mahjong, a game similar to (and thought to be the distant ancestor of) the Western card game rummy. Western dominoes games are believed to have developed from Asian tile games in the 18th century.Magic: The Gathering'' was the first collectible card game (or "trading card game") in 1993.

The line between card and board games is not clear-cut, as many card games, such as solitaire, involve playing cards to form a "tableau", a spatial layout or board. Many board games, in turn, uses specialized cards to provide random events, such as the Chance cards of Monopoly (game), or as the central mechanism driving play, as in many card-driven wargames.

As cards are typically shuffled and revealed gradually during play, most card games involve randomness, either initially or during play, and hidden information, such as the cards in a player's hand.  This is in contrast to many board games, in which most of the game's current state is visible to all participants, even though players may also have a small amount of private information, such as the letter tiles on each player's rack during Scrabble.

How players play their cards, revealing information and interacting with previous plays as they do so, is central to card game design. In partnership card games, such as Bridge, rules limiting communication between players on the same team become an important part of the game design. This idea of limited communication has been extended to cooperative card games, such as Hanabi.

Dice games

Dice games are among the oldest known games and have often been associated with gambling. Non-gambling dice games, such as Yatzy, Poker dice, or Yahtzee became popular in the mid-20th century.

The line between dice and board games is not clear-cut, as dice are often used as randomization devices in board games, such as Monopoly or Risk, while serving as the central drivers of play in games such as Backgammon or Pachisi.

Dice games differ from card games in that each throw of the dice is an independent event, whereas the odds of a given card being drawn are affected by all the previous cards drawn or revealed from a deck. Dice game design often centers around forming scoring combinations and managing re-rolls, either by limiting their number, as in Yahtzee or by introducing a press-your-luck element, as in Can't Stop.

Casino games

Casino game design can entail the creation of an entirely new casino game, the creation of a variation on an existing casino game, or the creation of a new side bet on an existing casino game.

Casino game mathematician, Michael Shackleford has noted that it is much more common for casino game designers today to make successful variations than entirely new casino games. Gambling columnist John Grochowski points to the emergence of community-style slot machines in the mid-1990s, for example, as a successful variation on an existing casino game type.

Unlike the majority of other games which are designed primarily in the interest of the player, one of the central aims of casino game design is to optimize the house advantage and maximize revenue from gamblers. Successful casino game design works to provide entertainment for the player and revenue for the gambling house.

To maximise player entertainment, casino games are designed with simple easy-to-learn rules that emphasize winning (i.e. whose rules enumerate many victory conditions and few loss conditions), and that provide players with a variety of different gameplay postures (e.g. card hands). Player entertainment value is also enhanced by providing gamblers with familiar gaming elements (e.g. dice and cards) in new casino games.

To maximise success for the gambling house, casino games are designed to be easy for croupiers to operate and for pit managers to oversee.

The two most fundamental rules of casino game design are that the games must be non-fraudable (including being as nearly as possible immune from advantage gambling) and that they must mathematically favor the house winning. Shackleford suggests that the optimum casino game design should give the house an edge of smaller than 5%.

Role-playing games

The design of role-playing games requires the establishment of setting, characters, and basic gameplay rules or mechanics. After a role-playing game is produced, additional design elements are often devised by the players themselves. In many instances, for example, character creation is left to the players. Likewise, the progression of a role-playing game is determined in large part by the gamemaster whose individual campaign design may be directed by one of several role-playing game theories.

There is no central core for tabletop role-playing game theory because different people want such different things out of the games.  Probably the most famous category of RPG theory, GNS Theory assumes that people want one of three things out of the game – a better, more interestingly challenging game, to create a more interesting story, or a better simulation – in other words better rules to support worldbuilding. GNS Theory has been abandoned by its creator, partly because it neglects emotional investment, and partly because it just didn't work properly. There are techniques that people use (such as dice pools) to better create the game they want – but with no consistent goal or agreement for what makes for a good game there's no overarching theory generally agreed on.

Sports

Sports games are made with the same rules as the sport the game portrays.

Video games

Video game design is a process that takes place in the pre-production phase of video game development. In the video game industry, game design describes the creation of the content and rules of a video game. The goal of this process for the game designer is to provide players with the opportunity to make meaningful decisions in relation to playing the game. Elements of video game design such as the establishment of fundamental gameplay rules provide a framework within which players will operate, while the addition of narrative structures provide players with a reason to care about playing the game. To establish the rules and narrative, an internally consistent game world is created, requiring visual, audio, and programming development for world, character, and level design. The amount of work that is required to accomplish this often demands the use of a design team which may be divided into smaller game design disciplines. In order to maintain internal consistency between the teams, a specialized software design document known as a "game design document" (and sometimes an even broader scope "game bible" document) provides overall contextual guidance on ambient mood, appropriate tone, and other less tangible aspects of the game world.

Important aspects of video game design are human-computer interaction and game feel.

War games

The first military war games, or Kriegsspiel, were designed in Prussia in the 19th century to train staff officers. They are also played as a hobby for entertainment.

Modern war games are designed to test doctrines, strategies and tactics in full scale exercises with opposing forces at venues like the NTC, JRTC and the JMRC, involving NATO countries.

See also

 Gamification
 Play (activity)
 Video game design

Notes

References

Further reading
 
 
 
 
 
 
 
 .
 
 .
 
 
 .
 .
 
 
 
 
 

 
Game theory
Leisure activities